is a Japanese video game designer currently employed by Kojima Productions. He has worked on every console title in Hideo Kojima's Metal Gear series and made his directorial debut with Metal Gear Rising: Revengeance. Kimura was the director of the original prequel version of the game, Metal Gear Solid: Rising, before it was cancelled and turned into a sequel to Metal Gear Solid 4: Guns of the Patriots.

Works
 Metal Gear Solid (1998) - Modeler, Texture Artist
 Metal Gear Solid 2: Sons of Liberty (2001) - Mechanical Art Director
 Metal Gear Solid: The Twin Snakes (2004) - Mechanical Model Supervisor
 Metal Gear Solid 3: Snake Eater (2004) - Lead Background Artist
 Metal Gear Solid 4: Guns of the Patriots (2008) - Lead Background Artist
 Metal Gear Rising: Revengeance (2013) - CG Director
 Metal Gear Solid V: Ground Zeroes (2014) - Lead Environment Artist, Artwork
 Metal Gear Solid V: The Phantom Pain (2015) - Lead Environment Artist
 Metal Gear Survive (2018) - Art Manager

References

Japanese video game designers
Konami people
Living people
Year of birth missing (living people)